Moussa Nakhl Tobias State Airport , commonly known as Bauru–Arealva Airport is the main airport serving Bauru and Arealva, Brazil. It is named after the Lebanese businessman and vice-mayor Moussa Nakhl Tobias (1940-2003), who immigrated to Brazil in 1959 and established himself in Bauru. 
 
It is operated by Rede Voa.

History
The airport was built as a replacement to the older Comte. João Ribeiro de Barros Airport and opened on 23 October 2006, when all scheduled traffic was transferred to this new facility.

On July 15, 2021 the concession of the airport was auctioned to Rede Voa, under the name Consórcio Voa NW e Voa SE. The airport was previously operated by DAESP.

Airlines and destinations

Access

See also

List of airports in Brazil

References

External links

Airports in São Paulo (state)
Airports established in 2006
2006 establishments in Brazil